= Pagra Bada =

Village in Madhya Pradesh, India

- Village
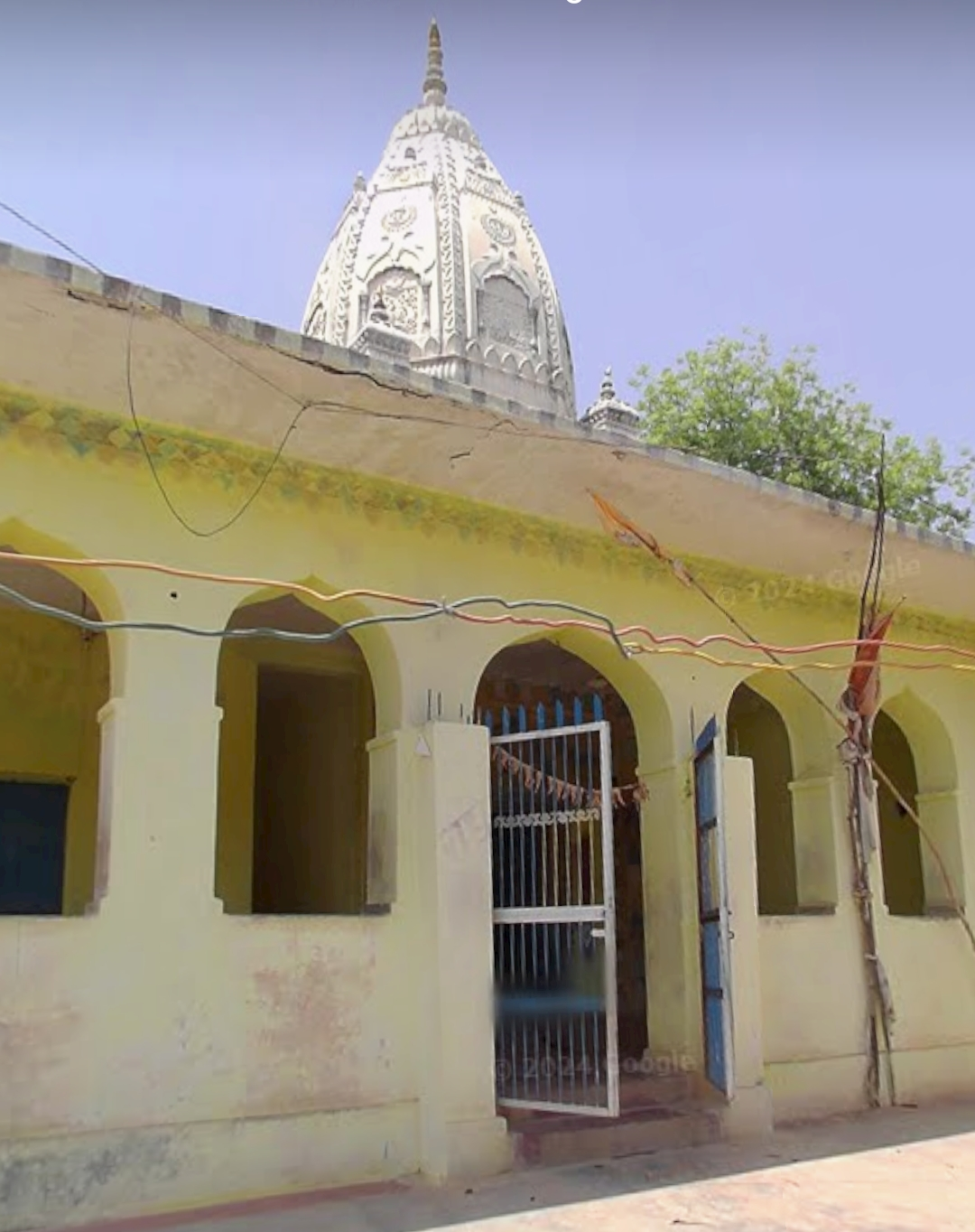
- Bihari Ji Mandir in Pagra Bada

- Location in Madhya Pradesh, India
- Coordinates: 24.3523223°N 80.0011211°E
- Country: India
- State: Madhya Pradesh
- District: Panna
- Tehsil: Amanganj

Area
  - Total: 13.49 km^{2} (5.21 sq mi)

Population (2011)
  - Total: 2,470

Languages
  - Official: Hindi
- Time zone: UTC+5:30 (IST)
- Vehicle registration: MP-35

Pagra Bada is a village located in the Amanganj tehsil of Panna district, Madhya Pradesh, India. It is part of a gram panchayat that includes three villages: Pagra Bada, Judi, and Madaiyan.
